The United Presbyterian Church in Pullman, Washington, also known as the Greystone Church, is a historic Presbyterian church which was listed on the National Register of Historic Places in 1989.  In 2014 it is an apartment building.

Mainly built in 1914, it is a "massive structure built of quarry-faced, ashlar Tenino sandstone on a base of rough cut basalt".  It was designed by prolific local architect William Swain.

The original church on the site was a wood frame building built in 1898-99.  In 1912 this building was moved to the back of the property and rotated 90 degrees.  A larger stone church was built in front in 1914, and the original building was faced in the same quarry-faced stone to unify the entire composition."

References

Presbyterian churches in Washington (state)
Churches on the National Register of Historic Places in Washington (state)
Buildings and structures in Pullman, Washington
Romanesque Revival church buildings in Washington (state)
Churches completed in 1914
20th-century Presbyterian church buildings in the United States
National Register of Historic Places in Whitman County, Washington